Zenarestat (FK-366; FR-74366) is an aldose reductase inhibitor. It was investigated as a treatment of diabetic neuropathy and cataract, but its development was terminated.

References
 M. Hashimoto et al., EP 218999; eidem, US 4734419 (1987, 1988 both to Fujisawa)
 Inhibition kinetics and effect on sorbitol accumulation: S. Ao et al., Metabolism 40, 77 (1991)
 Pharmacokinetics and metabolism in diabetic rats: Y. Tanaka et al., Drug Metab. Dispos. 21, 677 (1993)
 M. Kanamaru et al., J. Clin. Pharmacol. 33, 1122 (1993).

Abandoned drugs
Aldose reductase inhibitors
Orphan drugs